Paul Erich Frielinghaus (born 14 December 1959 in Darmstadt, West Germany) is a German television actor. Since 2000 he plays a leading role on the German TV series Ein Fall für Zwei.

External links
 
 ZBF Agency Berlin 

1959 births
Living people
Actors from Darmstadt
German male television actors
German male film actors
21st-century German male actors